Bernard is a city in Dubuque County, Iowa, United States. The population was 114 in the 2020 census, an increase from the 97 population in 2000. Bernard is part of the Dubuque, Iowa Metropolitan Statistical Area.

Geography
Bernard's longitude and latitude coordinatesin decimal form are 42.313622, -90.831073.

Demographics

2010 census
As of the census of 2010, there were 112 people, 50 households, and 27 families living in the city. The racial makeup of the city was 100.0% White.

There were 50 households, of which 26.0% had children under the age of 18 living with them, 44.0% were married couples living together, 10.0% had a female householder with no husband present, and 46.0% were non-families. 40.0% of all households were made up of individuals, and 18% had someone living alone who was 65 years of age or older. The average household size was 2.24 and the average family size was 3.07.

The median age in the city was 32.5 years. 22.3% of residents were under the age of 18; 10.8% were between the ages of 18 and 24; 27.8% were from 25 to 44; 20.6% were from 45 to 64; and 18.8% were 65 years of age or older. The gender makeup of the city was 51.8% male and 48.2% female.

2000 census
As of the census of 2000, there were 97 people, 46 households, and 25 families living in the city. The racial makeup of the city was 100.0% White.

There were 46 households, out of which 23.9% had children under the age of 18 living with them, 47.8% were married couples living together, 6.5% had a female householder with no husband present, and 43.5% were non-families. 37.0% of all households were made up of individuals, and 19.6% had someone living alone who was 65 years of age or older. The average household size was 2.11 and the average family size was 2.85.

In the city, the population was spread out, with 19.6% under the age of 18, 7.2% from 18 to 24, 32.0% from 25 to 44, 19.6% from 45 to 64, and 21.6% who were 65 years of age or older. The median age was 40 years. For every 100 females, there were 115.6 males. For every 100 females age 18 and over, there were 116.7 males.

The median income for a household in the city was $30,000, and the median income for a family was $41,875. Males had a median income of $23,125 versus $19,167 for females. The per capita income for the city was $32,671. There were 7.4% of families and 6.1% of the population living below the poverty line, including no under eighteens and 9.5% of those over 64.

Education 
Bernard is within the Western Dubuque Community School District. Zoned schools include Cascade Elementary School, and Cascade Junior-Senior High School, both in Cascade.

It was previously served by Bernard Elementary School, which was located next to the Bernard Commercial Club Park, on a  plot of land. It opened in 1960, had its current building open in 1963, and received an addition in 1967. Family sizes in the area decreased, and as years passed the enrollment grew smaller and smaller. By 2017 the school was sharing employees with Cascade Elementary, and was required to send students in kindergarten and the second grade to Cascade Elementary as the numbers of students from those grades were too small; Bernard Elementary had a total of 31 students. The district stated that the yearly cost of operating the school per student was $14,000. In February 2017 four members of the school board voted to close the school while Mark Knuth, the president of the school board, chose to abstain from voting. Students were reassigned to Cascade Elementary.

Notable people 

Justin Albert Driscoll, (1920—1984) Roman Catholic bishop
Paul Vincent Donovan, (1924–2011) Roman Catholic bishop

References

External links

 

Cities in Iowa
Cities in Dubuque County, Iowa